Nigeria has extensive mangrove forests in the coastal region of the Niger Delta. Considered one of the most ecologically sensitive regions in the world, the Niger Delta mangrove forest is situated within a deltaic depositional environment. These mangrove forests serve a critical role in regional ecological and landscape composition, and support subsistence gathering practices, and market-based income opportunities. Anthropogenic development threatens the survival of Niger Delta mangrove populations.

Overview
  
Mangrove forests are found in 118 countries and territories worldwide, 75% of mangrove vegetation zones are located in intertidal tropic and sub-tropic habitats situated between 25° N and 25° S . Typically surrounding salient river deltas, mangrove regions support a variety of halophytes. These robust shrubs and trees, which have adapted to changing coastal conditions (such as inundation, sun exposure, anaerobic soil, and salinity concentration), play a substantive role in cultivating the biodiversity and wellbeing of the surrounding landscape.

Biological composition 

Biologically, six mangrove species make up these forests, including three species in the family Rhizophoraceae (Rhizophora racemosa (red mangrove; tall), Rhizophora harrisonii (red mangrove; dwarf), Rhizophora mangle (red mangrove; dwarf)), and species in the family Avicenniaceae (white mangrove) and Combretaceae. Of these species, Rhizophora racemosa occupies the greatest density of the forest, accounting for approximately 90% of all mangrove biota. Despite expansive geographic coverage, the Niger Delta mangrove forest has approximately 80% of its vegetation distributed in three states (Bayelsa, Delta, and River states).

Although the forest is composed of six mangrove species, mangrove growth is primarily situated in brackish muddy creek banks. Studies have indicated that Rhizophora racemosa (which is the tallest mangrove species) reaches its optimized growth potential when exposed to brackish water and soft mud, whereas R. racemosa'''s relatives, R. mangle and R. harrisonii,'' favor higher salinity and hard mud. In its natural state, mangrove soil or “chikoko” (a mixture of acid sulphate, silty clay, clay loam and peat), has a pH of 4 and 6 for mangroves inhabiting low-tide and high-tide locations, respectively. If salinity levels shift too much from these levels, mudflats become unsuitable for mangrove production, and the process of mangrove reforestation (from infertile mangrove land to productive mangrove mudflat) can take upwards of one century.

Socio-ecological vitality 

The Niger Delta mangrove forests play critical roles for 60% of local peoples who rely on the land and sea for survival. The forests contribute local therapeutic, amenity, heritage, spiritual, and existence values. Responses from a survey conducted in 2007 and 2008 evaluating mangrove social value in three Niger Delta communities indicated approximately 85% of participant households had previously utilized mangrove vegetation as a medicinal remedy and between 65% and 71% of villagers recognized the mangrove forests as a place of repose. Further, each study village relied on the local mangrove forest for carrying out cultural traditions (relying on forest as an ancestral burying site or place of festivity such as in Buguma), spiritual significance, and the survival of locally resource-dependent communities.

Another study evaluating the socio-economic importance of mangrove forests to 950 households residing in Akassa, Bayelsa revealed a strong connection between mangroves and the primary and secondary occupations of individuals living in proximity to the forests. The study noted that while not all residents’ vocations directly relied on mangrove resource extraction, all households depended on the forest for resources to fulfill their basic physiological needs (such as fuelwood, mangrove material for medicine, wood to construct shelter, and forest space for hunting sustenance staples like snails, fish and crab). The Niger Delta mangrove forests directly (through raw materials) and indirectly (through forest-based products) offer economically beneficial resources for Nigerian rural and urban communities alike, with eight out of the ten most lucrative vocations dependent on thriving mangrove populations. These occupations include: canoe carving, logging, timber harvesting, building, fishing, sawmilling, traditional medicine, and trading.

Biodiversity 

The ecological importance of mangroves expands well beyond the resources of their roots and wood. Playing a key part in many fish, invertebrate, crustacean, and mollusk species’ lifecycles, mangroves offer organisms a breeding ground, shelter, and sustenance (mangroves are capable of producing 3.65 tons of leaf matter per hectare per year, which is a key contribution to the food web that supports juvenile fish).  Mangroves offer these services to approximately 75% of the local commercially harvested fish population; in a properly functioning mangrove ecosystem, this means ~1.08 tons of fish can be supported by one hectare of mangroves each year. Mangroves are also used as shelter and breeding grounds by small mammals, shore birds, reptiles, and insects. One study analyzing local species dependency on mangrove populations in Pagbilao Bay, Quezon, discovered that nearly 128 fish species, 56 bird species, and 9 species of paneid shrimp relied on mangrove survival for breeding and shelter requirements.

Beyond supplying a sundry of basic biological needs to marine and terrestrial organisms, mangrove populations are also essential in preventing erosion and preserving the surrounding coastal landscape. UNEP research has demonstrated that the mangrove's robust build is efficient at reducing the total destructive capability of storms and wind surges by 70 to 90 percent. Mangroves also help protect the health and overall biodiversity of surrounding ecosystems by acting as a water filter. Filtration is enabled by the mangrove's capability to absorb and store heavy metals that would otherwise result in the release of metal pollution into nearshore water bodies. Mangroves are also efficient sites of carbon storage. Gail Chmura, scientist at McGill University, revealed a mangrove's carbon storing capability is greater than that of a terrestrial forest; per-year, mangroves are capable of storing 42 million tons of carbon/hectare.

Threats to mangrove survival 
There are many environmental threats to the mangrove forests in the Niger Delta.

Oil extraction is the largest threat to Nigeria's mangrove forests. Comprising 97 percent of Nigeria's total exports, the oil-rich Niger Delta produces up to two million barrels of crude oil a day, which has placed Nigeria as the 9th oil producing country in the world. Such extensive oil extraction has come at great environmental and social cost. Since 1958, the Nigerian Federal Ministry of Environment has estimated 13 million barrels of oil have been spilled during extraction processes. These spills are the product of many factors, which include: unenforced drilling regulations, refinery leaks, pipeline corrosion, vandalism, and human error. The total number of annual spills has gradually increased since 1958, from approximately 250 spills per year to 500 spills per year. The Nigerian Oil Industry, which primarily extracts oil amongst the Niger Delta mangrove forests, has consequently deforested mangrove ecological zones for drilling purposes, and deteriorated the health of the surrounding mangroves. Petroleum has toxicological impacts on mangrove trees, but also causes direct physical damage. The toxic effects of both surface-level and sediment deposit oil exposure on mangrove health has been repeatedly scientifically documented. In 1986, scientists analyzing the impact of the Bahía las Minas oil spill on coastal vegetation reported clusters of dying mangroves in proximity to where oil had washed ashore. On average, studies revealed mangrove fatality rates were highest during the first six-months of a spill; thus, fresh crude oil spills had greater toxicity than “weathered” oil. Other natural experiments noted that factors such as mangrove exposure to water currents and spill contamination control plays a substantive role in predicting the extent of oil damage on a mangrove population. Oil contact with mangrove seedlings also revealed extensive damage; when placed in the presence of crude, greater than 96 percent of mangrove seedlings died.

Petroleum, which comprises hydrocarbon compound contaminants such as PAHs (Polycyclic aromatic hydrocarbons), has been connected to plant chlorophyll damage. As a result of PAH root absorption, mangrove leaf pigmentation is altered, limiting photosynthesis. Regardless of oil toxicity or soil absorption capacity, mangroves can be fatally damaged from surface-oil spills as oil coats cells that allow oxygen to reach the roots, resulting in oxygen deprivation and incapacity of necessary biological processes.

Historically, petroleum's detrimental impact on delta biodiversity (including threatening mangrove existence) has sparked non-violent and violent citizen responses. Communities facing threats to health, livelihoods and prosperity from the economic, environmental, and structural injustice resulting from local oil extraction have reacted together to fight for the indigenous right to existence and Niger Delta resource autonomy. While some movements such as the Movement for the Survival of the Ogoni People (MOSOP) relayed demands through non-violent protest, other organizations have responded to repeated degradative practices and governmentally unenforced industry regulations through violence. Established in 2006, the Movement for the Emancipation of the Niger Delta (MEND) is a rebel militant group challenging wealth polarization, environmental disregard, and economic instability brought about by delta oil production. Through monkeywrenching industry equipment, blowing-up pipelines, and kidnapping oil workers, MEND seeks to fracture Nigeria's oil economy. Despite justifying their violent actions by the need to obtain justice, MEND is recognized by various international governing bodies as a terrorist organization.

In addition to mangrove degradation from regional oil extraction practices, mass deforestation has threatened Niger Delta mangrove populations. A study published in 2011 by Oluseyi Fabiyi revealed that anthropogenic development was the chief agent driving deforestation in Southwestern Nigeria. These anthropogenic factors included agricultural growth and urban expansion. Fabiyi argued these variables led to greater deforestation rates than forest clearing resulting from oil extraction.

In a GIS analysis of deforestation patterns of Niger Delta wetlands conducted by Glory Enaruvbe and Ozien Atafo in 2014, water body area in the target location decreased by 7 percent in 11 years (between 2002 and 2013), and forest area decreased by four percent. Enaruvbe and Atafo noted that locals’ perceptions of economic opportunity and increased demand for ecological services guided increased deforestation patterns.

Conservation efforts 

Despite exploitation, fragmentation, and degradation, no policy has been enacted in Nigeria with the sole purpose to conserve endangered mangrove forests. Although neither federal or state institutions have ratified protection efforts, citizens of the Niger Delta states have banded together in attempt to defend the depreciating mangrove populations. One coalition, the Mangrove Forest Conservation Society of Nigeria, established in 1995, has spread its vision of establishing peaceful and sustainable coexistence between regional rural development and mangrove ecosystems across numerous Niger Delta cities (such as Asaba, Benin, Calabar, Lagos, Port Harcourt, Uyo, and Yenegoa).

Unintentionally affecting mangrove conservation, in 1989, the National Policy on Environment was developed in Nigeria. This policy resulted in 14.2% of Nigeria's land mass qualifying as protected area, securing 988 nationally protected reserves and 12 protected areas under international conventions. According to the Nigerian Department of National Parks, the reserves collectively represent a variety of Nigeria's most essential ecological zones; among these signified zones are tropical and wetland forests. Despite federally declaring these 1,000 sites protected, under-regulation and mismanagement has resulted in anthropogenic exploitation of reserve resources. Deforestation has been propelled by demand for bushmeat, timber, and vegetation.

Although mangrove conservation policy has yet to be established in Nigeria, published studies have demonstrated the affirmative prospective impact human intervention can have on remediating and protecting mangrove forests. A 2013 GIS study conducted by Oluwagbenga Ol Orimoogunje and Opeyemi Ajibola- James analyzed the recovery capability of oil exposed mangroves in two polluted Niger Delta sites. Both sites contained contaminated areas greater than 20 km 2 in size, but one site was remediated whereas the other was not. Mangrove health was monitored for four time periods via RENA and GPS imagery spanning 1986 to 2007. In 1986 (pre-spill), both locations contained a Normalized Difference Vegetation Index (NDVI) value of .32. NDVI, which measures the amount of infrared energy produced by a plant, allowed researchers to determine the health of the mangrove study population based on the infrared levels reflected off  the canopy surface. This number served as starting point to determine the quantitative impact oil pollution had on mangrove health. In 2000, six years after the spill, NDVI values had changed. The remediated site contained a NDVI of .30 where the non-remediated site was evaluated at .27. After 2000, NDVI values began to increase in both fields, but the remediated site's NDVI remained higher than the non-remediated site (2007 remediated site had a NDVI of .36 whereas the non-remediated site's was .34). This study suggested that oil caused a decline in vegetation area and health, but that with remediation, health was mostly recovered, compared to sites that were not remediated.

References

Mangrove ecoregions
Ecoregions of Nigeria